Işıkeli can refer to:

 Işıkeli, Biga
 Işıkeli, Bayramiç